This is a list of the richest association football clubs in the world as ranked by Forbes magazine on their worth in U.S. dollars.

Current rankings 
As of 6 June 2022

Number one by year

Past rankings

2021
As of 12 April 2021

2019
As of 29 May 2019

2018
As of 15 June 2018

2017
As of 1 June 2017

2016
As of 1 May 2016

2015

As of 6 May 2015

2014
As of 15 July 2014

2013
As of 17 April 2013

2012
As of 19 April 2012

2011
As of 20 April 2011

2010
As of April 2010

2009
As of April 2009

2008

As of April 2008

Manchester United increased from $1.2 billion to $1.8 billion still remaining at top. While Real Madrid remains second due to an increase of $400 million. Arsenal also remain third after an approximate increase of $350 million.

2007

This is the list released in March 2007.

See also
 Deloitte Football Money League
 Forbes list of the most valuable sports teams
 List of the most valuable football clubs in the Americas
 List of professional sports leagues by revenue

References

21st century-related lists
Lists of association football clubs
Association football rankings
Forbes lists